‘Abd  al-Raḥmān  ibn  Marwān  al-Jillīqī (also known as  or "the Galician") (died ca. 889), was a Muwallad  whose family had come from northern Portugal and settled near Mérida.

In 868, leading a host of Muwallads and Mozarabs, he rebelled against Emir Muhammad I of Córdoba and after a heroic resistance he got honourable surrendering terms from the Emir and was given Badajoz, which he started to fortify.

Knowing of an incoming attack by the Emirate forces, he fled northwards settling in the castle of Karkar (now Carquere, near Lamego, Portugal). Afterwards, at Ibn Marwân's request, king Alfonso III of León sent him auxiliary troops and the combined army defeated the Emirate forces. 

Returning to Badajoz, now a well-fortified city, he established his rule throughout the whole of the Al'Garb Al'Andalus.

Together with his ally Sāʿḍūn al-Ṣurunbāqī, the other important Muwallad rebel leader in Western al-Andalus, Ibn Marwan expelled the Banu Dānis from Coimbra. Between 876 and 877 he also erected the Castle of Marvão, in Portugal, a place already known in the 10th century as Amaia de Ibn Maruán or Fortaleza de Amaia.
His dynasty lasted until 930.

References
VELOZO, Francisco José (1969), Um Muçulmano Precursor da Independência Portuguesa: Bem Marvão, o Galego in O Islão, n.º 5, Agosto.
CAMPOS, José A. Correia de, Monumentos da antiguidade árabe em Portugal, pp. 111–112.

880s deaths
People from the Emirate of Córdoba
Rebels of the medieval Islamic world
People from Galicia (Spain)
9th-century people from al-Andalus
Year of birth unknown
Al-Andalus military personnel
Muwallads